Selwyn may refer to:

Institutions
 Selwyn College, Auckland, is a multicultural, co-educational high school in Auckland, New Zealand
 Selwyn College, Cambridge, one of the University of Cambridge colleges, UK
 Selwyn College, Otago, hall of residence at the University of Otago, New Zealand
 Selwyn House School, private independent boys' school in Westmount, Quebec, Canada
 Selwyn School, a private school in Denton, Texas, US
 Harris and Selwyn Theaters, twin theatres in Chicago, Illinois, US
 American Airlines Theatre, New York City, originally called the Selwyn Theatre

People 
 Selwyn (name), including lists of people with the surname and given name
 Selwyn (singer), Australian R&B singer

Places

Australia
 Selwyn, Queensland, a ghost town
 Selwyn County, New South Wales, one of the 141 Cadastral divisions of New South Wales, Australia
 Selwyn Snowfields, a ski resort in New South Wales, Australia
 Selwyn Range (Australia), a range of highlands in north-west Queensland, Australia
 Selwyn's Rock, glaciated pavement in  Inman Valley, South Australia

Canada
 Selwyn Range (British Columbia), a subrange of the Canadian Rockies near Mount Robson
 Selwyn Mountains, a large mountain range in Yukon and the Northwest Territories
 Selwyn, Ontario, a township

New Zealand
 Selwyn District, rural district in central Canterbury, New Zealand
 Selwyn (New Zealand electorate), one of the current electorates in the New Zealand House of Representatives
 Selwyn River / Waikirikiri, a river in the Selwyn District
 Selwyn, New Zealand, a settlement on the south bank of the Selwyn River

United States
 Selwyn, West Virginia
 Selwyn (Mechanicsville, Virginia), a historic home